The Argenta War Cemetery is a Commonwealth War Graves Commission and is found in the Commune of Argenta, Ferrara, Italy. The town of Argenta is located two kilometres south.

The cemetery holds many soldiers killed in the battles of Argenta Gap and Lake Comacchio.

Notable burials
 Arthur Banks GC (1923–1944)
 Tom Hunter (VC) (1923–1945)
 Anders Lassen VC, MC & Two Bars (1920–1945)

External links
 Commonwealth War Graves Commission
 

War cemeteries in Italy
Commonwealth War Graves Commission cemeteries in Italy
Cemeteries in Italy